Inhibin beta C chain is a protein that in humans is encoded by the INHBC gene.

This gene encodes the beta C chain of inhibin, a member of the TGF-beta superfamily. This subunit forms heterodimers with beta A and beta B subunits. Inhibins and activins, also members of the TGF-beta superfamily, are hormones with opposing actions and are involved in hypothalamic, pituitary, and gonadal hormone secretion, as well as growth and differentiation of various cell types.

References

Further reading